"A Stake to the Heart" is a trade paperback collecting comic book stories based on the Buffy the Vampire Slayer television series.

Story description

General synopsis 

Although new to being a slayer, Buffy Summers has already faced vampires and a series of dark forces, but must now try to cope with the collapse of her parents' marriage. Vampires fear for their safety as Buffy takes out her anger on the streets of L.A. The mysterious vampire with a soul, known as Angel, watches over her.

Hoping to ease her pain with magic, Angel unintentionally releases malignancy demons upon the Summers family. Each of the four demons draws from a particular bad feeling.

Buffy the Vampire Slayer #60 

Comic title: "A Stake To The Heart, act 1"

Buffy is struggling to cope with the lack of guidance from a Watcher about her role as slayer, and faces the likely upcoming divorce between her parents. Feeling sorry for Buffy, Angel performs a spell that he hopes will make the pressures of life easier on her.

Buffy the Vampire Slayer #61 

Comic title: "A Stake To The Heart, act 2"

Buffy Summers's life isn't going as she might have hoped, as her parents' marriage comes to an end. A string of emotion demons are released upon her, that feed on her negative emotions. Buffy faces the malignancy demons of deceit and guilt.

Buffy the Vampire Slayer #62 

Comic title: "A Stake To The Heart, act 3"

The malignancy demons continue to feed from the Summers women, expanding the negative emotions within them. Buffy unknowingly faces the abandonment demon.

Buffy the Vampire Slayer #63 

Comic title: "A Stake To The Heart, act 4"

Buffy arrives in Sunnydale along with the malignancy demons. The trepidation demon hopes to make Buffy give up on life, and maybe even the whole of Sunnydale might just follow suit. Other members of Sunnydale begin to feel the effects of the demon.

Cast 
Characters include Buffy, Willow, Xander, Giles, Dawn, Joyce, Hank, Angel, Whistler, and Lilah.

References to the television series
 In Act 2, when Giles is unpacking in his house, we can see the Life Time calendar he tells Buffy about in Welcome to the Hellmouth.
 At the end of Act 4, Joyce lies down on a particular couch and states "I could die right here", an obvious reference to The Body.

References